The Anthony Wayne School is an historic former school building located in the Grays Ferry neighborhood of Philadelphia, Pennsylvania. It was designed by Henry deCoursey Richards and built between 1908 and 1909. 

Named for United States Army general and statesman Anthony Wayne (1745–1786), the building was added to the National Register of Historic Places in 1986.

History and features
 Designed by Henry deCoursey Richards, the Anthony Wayne School was built between 1908 and 1909. 

A four-story, five-bay, reinforced concrete building, clad in brick and designed in the Late Gothic Revival-style, it features a projecting entrance with terra cotta ornament, a projecting multi-story terra cotta bay, terra cotta decorative panels and a parapet. The school was named for United States Army general and statesman Anthony Wayne (1745–1786).

The building was added to the National Register of Historic Places in 1986. It is now used as senior housing.

References

School buildings on the National Register of Historic Places in Philadelphia
Gothic Revival architecture in Pennsylvania
School buildings completed in 1909
South Philadelphia
1909 establishments in Pennsylvania